The Thermoprotei is a class of the Thermoproteota.

Phylogeny
The currently accepted taxonomy is based on the List of Prokaryotic names with Standing in Nomenclature (LPSN) and National Center for Biotechnology Information (NCBI).

References

Further reading

Scientific journals

Scientific books
 
 

Charles

External links

Archaea classes
Thermoproteota